–  – is a monthly cultural and arts magazine which has been published since 1956 in Pyongyang, North Korea. It is an official media outlet of the state owned federation of the literary and artistic unions, namely the Korean Federation of Literature and Arts.

History and profile
Choson Yesul was launched in 1956 and is published on a monthly basis. The magazine is an official organ of the Central Committee of the Korean Federation of Literature and Arts. The headquarters is in Pyongyang.

The publisher of Choson Yesul was Munhak Yesul Chonghap Ch'ulp'ansa from January 1995 to August 2001. From September 2001 the publisher was Munhak Yesul Ch'ulp'ansa. The magazine frequently features articles promoting the North Korean leadership. For instance, it published the articles about Kim Jong-il and his parents using visuals as a tribute to his birthday in the mid-1970s.

References

External links

1956 establishments in North Korea
Communist magazines
Magazines established in 1956
Magazines published in North Korea
Mass media in Pyongyang
Monthly magazines
Propaganda newspapers and magazines
State media
Visual arts magazines